Walter Taylor Reveley III (born January 6, 1943) is an American legal scholar and former lawyer. He served as the twenty-seventh president of the College of William & Mary. Formerly Dean of its law school from August 1998 to February 2008, Reveley was appointed interim president of William & Mary on February 12, 2008 following Gene Nichol's resignation earlier that day, and was elected the university's 27th president by the Board of Visitors on September 5, 2008. While president, Reveley continued his service as the John Stewart Bryan Professor of Jurisprudence at the law school.

Reveley's areas of academic specialty include the constitutional division of authority between the President and Congress over the use of American armed force abroad, administrative and energy law, and the role of the citizen lawyer. He is the author of the 1981 book War Powers of the President and Congress:  Who Holds the Arrows and the Olive Branch?. He co-directed the National War Powers Commission in 2007–09.

Career 
Reveley graduated with an A.B. in politics from Princeton University in 1965 after completing a senior thesis titled "Between North and South: The United Nations Conference on Trade and Development." He then received his J.D. from the University of Virginia Law School in 1968. He has honorary doctorates from Hampden-Sydney College, King University and the College of William & Mary. He is a member of Phi Beta Kappa, Order of the Coif, and ODK.

Reveley was an assistant professor of law at the University of Alabama in 1968–69. He clerked for Justice William J. Brennan at the United States Supreme Court in 1969–70. In 1972–73, he studied the war powers as a Fellow of the Woodrow Wilson International Center for Scholars in Washington, D.C. and an International Affairs Fellow of the Council of Foreign Relations in New York City.

Before joining William and Mary, Reveley practiced law for almost three decades at Hunton & Williams, specializing in energy and environmental matters, especially regarding commercial nuclear power. He was the managing partner of the firm for nine years during a time of significant growth in its national and international reach.

Reveley has served on many cultural and educational boards, including those of Princeton University, Union Presbyterian Seminary, St. Christopher's School, the Andrew W. Mellon Foundation, the Presbyterian Church (USA) Foundation, the Oak Spring Foundation, the Carnegie Endowment for International Peace, JSTOR, the Richmond Symphony, the Virginia Museum of Fine Arts, the Virginia Historical Society, and the Virginia Foundation for the Humanities.

Three Successive generations of the Reveley family have been presidents of schools in Virginia. Reveley's father, W. Taylor Reveley II, was president of Hampden-Sydney College from 1963 to 1977. His son, W. Taylor Reveley IV, became president of Longwood University in March 2013.

Reveley retired as William & Mary's president on June 30, 2018. He was succeeded by Katherine Rowe, the first woman to lead William & Mary since its founding in 1693.

See also 
 List of law clerks of the Supreme Court of the United States (Seat 3)

References

External links
Full biography
National War Powers Commission
Reveley Reflects on Past Decade

1943 births
Living people
College of William & Mary faculty
Law clerks of the Supreme Court of the United States
Deans of law schools in the United States
People from Churchville, Virginia
Presidents of the College of William & Mary
Princeton University alumni
University of Virginia School of Law alumni
Virginia lawyers
American male writers
20th-century American lawyers